Playbox is a British children's television programme that was broadcast on BBC from 1955 to 1964. Presenters who appeared on it included Eamonn Andrews, Rolf Harris, Tony Hart, Cliff Michelmore and Johnny Morris.

References

External links 
 

1950s British children's television series
1960s British children's television series
1955 British television series debuts
1964 British television series endings
British children's television series
British preschool education television series